Viva la Dolce Vita is an album by Italian baritone Patrizio Buanne, which was released on April 17, 2015 in Australia. It entered the Australian pop albums chart the next week at No. 44, later peaking at No. 33 and additionally peaking at No. 1 on the Australian ARIA Classical/Crossover Albums Chart.

The album includes an Italian version of the Charlie Chaplin song "Smile" as well as an English/Italian version of the Elvis Presley song "Surrender", original compositions such as "I Will Love You" and popular Italian songs such as "Gli Occhi Miei".

Buanne promoted the album on several TV shows in Australia, such as The Morning Show, where he performed the song "I Will Love You" and on TVSN, which sold signed copies of the albums via television.

Track listing

Charts

References

2015 albums
Patrizio Buanne albums